Nash Island Light is a lighthouse on Nash Island at the entrance to Pleasant Bay in Maine.

History
It was first established in 1838. The present structure was built in 1874. It was replaced by a buoy in 1982.  The USCG historical site says that it included a one-room schoolhouse, although that's hard to understand on a small offshore island.

Keepers

 John Wass (1847–1853)
 Daniel Curtis (1853-unknown)
 Enos D. Wass (1865–1872)
 Edwin K. Heath (1872–1876)
 Nehemiah Guptill (1876–1881)
 Roscoe G. Lophaus (1881–1883)
 Charles S. Holt (1883–1902)
 Osmond Cummings 
 Allen Carter Holt (1910–1916)
 John Purington (1916–1935)
 Edwin Pettegrow (c. 1930s)
 Larson Alley (unknown-1947)
 Edward Wallace (1947–1958)

References

External links
 New England Lighthouses: A Virtual Guide -- Nash Island Light

Lighthouses completed in 1874
Lighthouses in Washington County, Maine